On 3 March 2023, a coal mine explosion in the Harnai district of Balochistan, Pakistan resulted in the death of six miners who were digging at a depth of 1,500 feet.

Background 
Methane gas accumulation inside the mine caused the explosion and trapped the workers as a portion of the mine collapsed.

During the search and rescue operation, five rescue workers fell unconscious due to methane gas, but another team managed to save them. Unfortunately, the six miners had already died by the time rescue teams arrived. The incident highlights the danger of lax safety protocols in Balochistan's mines.

The Chief Minister of Balochistan, Mir Abdul Qudoos Bizenjo, ordered an inquiry into the incident and emphasized the need to take all possible measures to prevent such mishaps in coal mines.

References

2023 in Balochistan, Pakistan
Harnai District
2023 disasters in Pakistan
Disasters in Balochistan, Pakistan
March 2023 events in Pakistan